Slanestown is a townland in the civil parish of Mullingar in County Westmeath, Ireland.

The townland is located to the west of Mullingar town, between the R393 and R392 regional roads.

References 

Townlands of County Westmeath